Kelsey is an extinct town in Belmont County, in the U.S. state of Ohio.

History
A post office was established at Kelsey in 1882, and remained in operation until 1930. The community was named after William J. Kelsey, the original owner of the town site.

References

Ghost towns in Ohio
Landforms of Belmont County, Ohio
1882 establishments in Ohio
Populated places established in 1882